Lasha Shavdatuashvili (born 31 January 1992) is a Georgian judoka. Shavdatuashvili is one of the most successful judoka of the early 21st century, having won Olympic medals at the 2012, 2016 and 2020 Summer Olympics as well as a dozen medals on the IJF World Tour.

Judo career
Shavdatuashvili won the gold medal in the 66 kg event at the 2012 Summer Olympics.

Lasha Shavdatuashvili defeated Israeli judoka Sagi Muki during Rio 2016 Olympics and won bronze medal.

Shavdatuashvili again medaled at the delayed 2020 Summer Olympics, this time with a silver medal. He lost in the final contest to back-to-back gold medalist Shohei Ono via wazari.

He won the Male Athlete of the Year award at the 2021 Judo Awards.

References

External links
 
 
 
 
 

Judoka at the 2012 Summer Olympics
Judoka at the 2016 Summer Olympics
Judoka at the 2020 Summer Olympics
Male judoka from Georgia (country)
Olympic judoka of Georgia (country)
Living people
1992 births
People from Gori, Georgia
Olympic medalists in judo
Olympic gold medalists for Georgia (country)
Olympic silver medalists for Georgia (country)
Olympic bronze medalists for Georgia (country)
Medalists at the 2012 Summer Olympics
Medalists at the 2016 Summer Olympics
Medalists at the 2020 Summer Olympics
Judoka at the 2015 European Games
European Games medalists in judo
European Games silver medalists for Georgia (country)
Recipients of the Presidential Order of Excellence
World judo champions
21st-century people from Georgia (country)